The Only Way may refer to:

 The Only Way, a 1927 British film by Herbert Wilcox
 The Only Way, a 1970 American film by Bent Christensen
 The Only Way, a 2004 American film by David Zimmerman III and Levi Steven Obery
 The Only Way, a 1901 book by Leo Tolstoy
 "The Only Way", a 1971 song by Emerson, Lake & Palmer from the album Tarkus 
 "The Only Way", a 1982 song by Lisa Stansfield
 "The Only Way", a 1996 song by Yolanda Adams from the album Yolanda... Live in Washington